The men's 100 metre butterfly swimming events for the 2016 Summer Paralympics took place at the Olympic Aquatics Stadium from 8 to 17 September. A total of eleven events were contested for different classifications.

Competition format
Each event consisted of two rounds: heats and final. The top eight swimmers overall in the heats progressed to the final. If there were less than eight swimmers in an event, no heats were held and all swimmers qualify for the final.

Results

S8

20:15 9 September 2016:

S9

17:30 15 September 2016:

S10

18:36 12 September 2016:

S11

18:48 14 September 2016:

S13

19:32 8 September 2016:

References

Swimming at the 2016 Summer Paralympics